Ritika Verma (born 4 November 1998) is an Indian social worker and National Service Scheme volunteer who has been awarded National Service Scheme award 2019-20 by Honorable President of India Shri Ram Nath Kovind on 24 September 2021. This is considered as one of the highest awards of the National Service Scheme for a volunteer presented by Government of India. National Service Scheme awards are presented by Ministry of Youth Affairs and Sports, Government of India to the outstanding NSS volunteers to promote activities of NSS in India. Ritika got this award due to her excellent services on various social issues and causes as an NSS volunteer. She is well known for her services for community sensitization during COVID-19 pandemic.  Ritika is a former student of Panjab University Chandigarh India and has passed M.Sc. Anthropology with distinction.

See also 
 National Service Scheme
 Panjab University, Chandigarh

References

External links 
 

Living people
1998 births
Panjab University alumni
Indian women activists
People from Chandigarh district
Indian social workers